Kajetan Szmyt (born 29 May 2002) is a Polish professional footballer who plays as a right winger for Warta Poznań.

Career statistics

Club

References

External links

2002 births
Living people
Footballers from Poznań
Polish footballers
Poland under-21 international footballers
Association football wingers
Warta Poznań players
Górnik Polkowice players
Nielba Wągrowiec players
Ekstraklasa players
I liga players
II liga players
III liga players